Al-Waab Sporting Club is a Qatari football team based in the Al Waab district of Doha City, playing in the Qatari Second Division.

It was officially granted club status by the Qatar Football Association in September 2019, allowing it to participate in the 2019–20 season of the Qatari Second Division.

The club was formerly Al-Nasr SC and its name was changed to Al-Waab SC.

Current squad

As of Qatari Second Division:

References

External links
 Al-Waab SC at Kooora.com

Waab
2014 establishments in Qatar
Association football clubs established in 2014